Harold Edward Kitching (31 August 1885 – 18 August 1980) was a British rower who competed in the 1908 Summer Olympics and served as High Sheriff of Durham.

Kitching was born at Great Ayton, Yorkshire, the son of Alfred Edward Kitching and his wife Annie Backhouse Richardson. He was educated at Cambridge University and rowed for Cambridge in the Boat Race in  1908. The Cambridge crew made up a boat in the eights  which won the bronze medal for Great Britain rowing at the 1908 Summer Olympics. Kitching also rowed in the 1909 Boat Race.

Kitching served in the First World War, being made second lieutenant in the 5th Battalion, The Durham Light Infantry on 10 October 1914. He reached the rank of lieutenant colonel, and when he retired from the army he acquired Elmwood at Hartburn, Stockton-on-Tees where his former batman (Wilfred Young, father of Muriel who later found fame in television) became his chauffeur. He was active in agricultural affairs, being  chairman of Stokesley Agricultural Society

See also
List of Cambridge University Boat Race crews

References

1885 births
1980 deaths
English male rowers
British male rowers
Olympic rowers of Great Britain
Rowers at the 1908 Summer Olympics
Olympic bronze medallists for Great Britain
High Sheriffs of Durham
Olympic medalists in rowing
Alumni of Trinity Hall, Cambridge
Medalists at the 1908 Summer Olympics